The Pangu Pati, also known as the Pangu Party or Papua and Niugini Union Pati, is a political party in Papua New Guinea. Following the July 2022 elections, the party had 39 of 111 seats in the National Parliament.

History 
The party was founded in June 1967 by (in particular) Michael Somare, Albert Maori Kiki, Lucas Waka, Barry Holloway and Cecil Abel, "PANGU" standing for "Papua New Guinea Union." The initial interim executive was Somare, Joseph Nombri, Oala Oala-Rarua and Vin ToBaining, while it had nine members of the House of Assembly of Papua and New Guinea: Nicholas Brokam, Holloway, Wegra Kenu, Siwi Kurondo, Paul Lapun, Pita Lus, Paliau Maloat,  James Meanggarum and Tony Voutas.

Somare later served as Prime Minister of Papua New Guinea as the leader of the Pangu Party from 1972 to 1980 and from 1982 to 1985. In 1985, Paias Wingti led a faction of the party to split with Somare, and Wingti won a no confidence vote against Somare, succeeding him as prime minister. In 1988, Somare was replaced as leader of Pangu by Rabbie Namaliu who served as prime minister from 1988 to 1992. Somare would then become leader of the National Alliance Party.

At the 2002 elections, the party won 6 of 109 seats, under the leadership of Chris Haiveta. After that election, Somare returned to power as prime minister. Pangu became a member of his coalition government, and continued to support the Somare government after the 2007 elections, in which Pangu won 5 seats.

It won only one seat at the 2012 election, that of Angoram MP Ludwig Schulze, but was left unrepresented when Schulze died in March 2013. In August 2014, Deputy Opposition Leader Sam Basil crossed to Pangu and reactivated its parliamentary wing, taking on the leadership. The party's numbers increased to two in August 2015 when William Samb won a by-election in Goilala Open.

Election results

References

Political parties in Papua New Guinea
Main
Political parties established in 1967
1967 establishments in Oceania